The 1945 Nova Scotia general election was held on 23 October 1945 to elect members of the 43rd House of Assembly of the Province of Nova Scotia, Canada. It was won by the Liberal party. The Progressive Conservatives were entirely shut out of the Assembly, making the CCF's two MLAs the only opposition members.

Results

Results by party

Retiring incumbents
Co-operative Commonwealth 
Douglas Neil Brodie, Cape Breton East
Douglas MacDonald, Cape Breton Centre

Liberal
Alexander Stirling MacMillan, Hants
Harry Dennis Madden, Queens
John McDonald, Kings
John D. McKenzie, Annapolis
Havelock Torrey, Guysborough

Progressive Conservative
George Scott Dickey, Colchester

Nominated candidates
Legend
bold denotes party leader
† denotes an incumbent who is not running for re-election or was defeated in nomination contest

Valley

|-
|bgcolor=whitesmoke|Annapolis
||
|Henry Hicks4,88059.06%
|
|Horton Wheelock Phinney3,38340.94%
|
|
|
|
||
|John D. McKenzie†
|-
|bgcolor=whitesmoke|Digby
||
|Joseph William Comeau4,71459.13%
|
|Kenneth Earl Smith2,70633.94%
|
|Edgar Lawrence Outhouse5526.92%
|
|
||
|Joseph William Comeau
|-
|bgcolor=whitesmoke|Hants
||
|Robert A. MacLellan4,95152.66%
|
|Norman Dudley Murray3,19433.98%
|
|Frederick Charles Gilmore Scott1,25613.36%
|
|
||
|Alexander Stirling MacMillan†
|-
|bgcolor=whitesmoke|Kings
||
|David Durell Sutton7,02759.66%
|
|William Lawrence Chisholm4,75140.34%
|
|
|
|
||
|John Alexander McDonald†
|}

South Shore

|-
|rowspan=2 bgcolor=whitesmoke|Lunenburg
||
|Frank R. Davis6,86727.31%
|
|R. Clifford Levy5,85423.28%
|
|
|
|
||
|Frank R. Davis
|-
||
|Gordon E. Romkey6,83927.20%
|
|James A. MacLeod5,58522.21%
|
|
|
|
||
|Gordon E. Romkey
|-
|bgcolor=whitesmoke|Queens
||
|Merrill D. Rawding2,84448.17%
|
|Leonard William Fraser2,50342.39%
|
|Clarence Webber5579.43%
|
|
||
|Harry Dennis Madden†
|-
|bgcolor=whitesmoke|Shelburne
||
|Wilfred Dauphinee3,21455.85%
|
|Frederick William Bower2,20338.28%
|
|Cecil James O'Donnell3385.87%
|
|
||
|Wilfred Dauphinee
|-
|bgcolor=whitesmoke|Yarmouth 
||
|Henry A. Waterman5,00055.20%
|
|Frank Parker Day4,05844.80%
|
|
|
|
||
|Henry A. Waterman
|}

Fundy-Northeast

|-
|rowspan=2 bgcolor=whitesmoke|Colchester
||
|Gordon Purdy7,71429.18%
|
|Frederick Murray Blois5,51520.86%
|
|Clarence Vincent Fleury5472.07%
|
|
||
|Frederick Murray Blois
|-
||
|Robert F. McLellan6,63125.09%
|
|William A. Flemming5,38320.37%
|
|Sidney Mansfield Parker6422.43%
|
|
||
|George Scott Dickey†
|-
|rowspan=2 bgcolor=whitesmoke|Cumberland
||
|Martin J. Kaufman6,54021.67%
|
|Archie B. Smith6,27120.77%
|
|John James Crummey2,8679.50%
|
|
||
|Archie B. Smith
|-
||
|Kenneth Judson Cochrane6,99523.17%
|
|Norman Shaw Sanford5,80719.24%
|
|Joseph Bernard Murray1,7065.65%
|
|
||
|Kenneth Judson Cochrane
|}

Halifax/Dartmouth/Eastern Shore

|-
|bgcolor=whitesmoke|Halifax Centre
||
|James Edward Rutledge4,73755.22%
|
|Carl Palm Bethune2,27926.57%
|
|R.B. Mitchell1,56218.21%
|
|
||
|James Edward Rutledge
|-
|bgcolor=whitesmoke|Halifax East
||
|Geoffrey W. Stevens6,20653.48%
|
|A.L. Mattatall3,03326.14%
|
|Cecil Clyde Russell2,36620.39%
|
|
||
|Geoffrey W. Stevens
|-
|bgcolor=whitesmoke|Halifax North
||
|Harold Connolly6,08959.43%
|
|Bernard Joseph Vaughan1,77717.34%
|
|Thomas Burgess2,12020.69%
|
|Alexander Munro2602.54%
||
|Harold Connolly
|-
|bgcolor=whitesmoke|Halifax South
||
|Angus Lewis Macdonald5,18161.26%
|
|Arthur John Haliburton2,06724.44%
|
|Richard Leo Rooney1,08012.77%
|
|Andrew Matthews1291.53%
||
|Vacant
|-
|bgcolor=whitesmoke|Halifax West
||
|Ronald Manning Fielding4,99749.11%
|
|Malcolm Edgbert Walker2,78627.38%
|
|Fred Young2,39223.51%
|
|
||
|Ronald Manning Fielding
|}

Central Nova

|-
|bgcolor=whitesmoke|Antigonish 
||
|John Patrick Gorman2,65061.83%
|
|Douglas MacDonald1,63638.17%
|
|
|
|
||
|John Patrick Gorman
|-
|bgcolor=whitesmoke|Guysborough
||
|Arthur W. MacKenzie3,45662.07%
|
|Harold Vans Hudson2,11237.93%
|
|
|
|
||
|Havelock Torrey†
|-
|rowspan=2 bgcolor=whitesmoke|Pictou
||
|Alfred B. DeWolfe9,02024.83%
|
|Ernest G. Irish7,06119.44%
|
|G. Miller Dick1,5764.34%
|
|George J. White2450.67%
||
|Ernest G. Irish
|-
||
|Josiah H. MacQuarrie10,03127.61%
|
|John A. MacGregor6,70418.46%
|
|Donald L. Nicholson1,6884.65%
|
|
||
|Josiah H. MacQuarrie
|}

Cape Breton

|-
|bgcolor=whitesmoke|Cape Breton Centre
|
|Ronald McIsaac2,72638.37%
|
|Frank Doucette5187.29%
||
|Michael James MacDonald3,86054.34%
|
|
||
|Douglas MacDonald†
|-
|bgcolor=whitesmoke|Cape Breton East
|
|Gus McGillivray2,71930.03%
|
|Kenneth Daniel Beaton1,00211.07%
||
|Russell Cunningham5,33258.90%
|
|
||
|Douglas Neil Brodie†
|-
|bgcolor=whitesmoke|Cape Breton North
||
|Alexander O'Handley3,32838.48%
|
|Malcolm McDonald2,41627.94%
|
|Wendell Coldwell2,90433.58%
|
|
||
|Alexander O'Handley
|-
|bgcolor=whitesmoke|Cape Breton South
||
|John Smith MacIvor4,77843.10%
|
|Malcolm Cameron1,86116.79%
|
|Donald MacDonald4,44840.12%
|
|
||
|Donald MacDonald
|-
|bgcolor=whitesmoke|Cape Breton West
||
|Malcolm A. Patterson2,82649.82%
|
|Horace L. Ferguson1,00217.67%
|
|Robert Orr1,84432.51%
|
|
||
|Malcolm A. Patterson
|-
|bgcolor=whitesmoke|Inverness
||
|Alexander H. McKinnon5,28370.59%
|
|Alexander Angus MacInnes2,20129.41%
|
|
|
|
||
|Alexander H. McKinnon
|-
|bgcolor=whitesmoke|Richmond
||
|Lauchlin Daniel Currie3,14976.66%
|
|Frederick Albert Thurgood95923.34%
|
|
|
|
||
|Lauchlin Daniel Currie
|-
|bgcolor=whitesmoke|Victoria
||
|John Malcolm Campbell2,10164.69%
|
|William Ross MacAulay1,14735.31%
|
|
|
|
||
|John Malcolm Campbell
|}

References

 

1945
1945 elections in Canada
1945 in Nova Scotia
October 1945 events in Canada